Mister Dana Rina is a 2007 Sri Lankan Sinhala comedy film directed and produced by Roy de Silva. It stars Arjuna Kamalanath and Sangeetha Weeraratne in lead roles along with Roshan Pilapitiya and Anarkali Akarsha. Music composed by Sangeeth Wickramasinghe. It is the 1083rd Sri Lankan film in the Sinhala cinema. The film was released on 28 March 2010 in Chitra cinema, Kalutara.

Plot

Cast
 Arjuna Kamalanath as Micheal
 Sangeetha Weeraratne
 Roshan Pilapitiya as Roshan
 Anusha Damayanthi as Rita
 Anarkali Akarsha
 Sumana Amarasinghe
 Priyantha Seneviratne
 Ananda Wickramage
 Rajitha Hiran
 Sunil Hettiarachchi
 Teddy Vidyalankara
 Tyrone Michael

References

2007 films
2000s Sinhala-language films